El Casar is a station on Line 12 of the Madrid Metro. It is located in fare Zone B1. The station offers connection to Cercanías Madrid via El Casar railway station.

References 

Line 12 (Madrid Metro) stations
Buildings and structures in Getafe
Railway stations in Spain opened in 2003